Edouard Vereycken (1893-1965), also known as Edward Vereycken, was a Belgian sculptor whose work was influenced by Auguste Rodin and Jef Lambeaux. He was born in Antwerp, studied at the Royal Academy of Fine Arts (Antwerp), and worked in Italy, America, Canada, and France. In 1920 Vereycken won the Prix de Rome for his Perseus.

References 
 Sotheby's short biography
 Europe in Crisis: Intellectuals and the European Idea, 1917-1957, edited by Mark Hewitson, Matthew D'Auria, Berghahn Books, 2012, page 211. .
 Remembering the First World War, edited by Bart Ziino, Routledge, 2014, page 193. .

Belgian sculptors
1893 births
1965 deaths